Poul Jensen (28 March 1934 – 2000) was a Danish footballer who played 32 games for the Denmark national football team between 1959 and 1962, 21 of those as team captain.

Jensen played his entire career as right back for Vejle Boldklub. In 1958, Jensen took part in one of the clubs' biggest triumphs as Vejle won the Double. The next year the triumph was followed up as Vejle Boldklub went on to win the title once again, with Jensen selected as captain. He played 202 games league games and scored three league goals for Vejle, and played a total 259 games and scored five goals in all competitions for the club.

Jensen made his debut for Denmark in 1959 in a game against Iceland and went on to play thirty-two matches, captaining the team in twenty-one of them. In the 1960 Summer Olympics held in Rome, Jensen was part of the Danish team who reached the Final, picking up a silver medal as they lost to Yugoslavia. Jensen featured in all five matches for the Danes.

References

1934 births
Danish men's footballers
Vejle Boldklub players
Footballers at the 1960 Summer Olympics
Olympic footballers of Denmark
Olympic silver medalists for Denmark
Denmark international footballers
Olympic medalists in football
2000 deaths
People from Vejle Municipality
Medalists at the 1960 Summer Olympics
Association football defenders
Sportspeople from the Region of Southern Denmark